Microsoft Planner is a planning application available on the Microsoft 365 platform. The application is available to premium, business, and educational subscribers to Microsoft 365. Microsoft Planner is a team-work oriented tool that can be used in a variety of ways. Some of Planner's uses include team management, file sharing, and organization. On June 6, 2016 Microsoft made the application available for general release and rolled it out over the first few weeks to eligible subscription plans. Microsoft Planner is available through the App store and the Google Play store, as well as on a computer. This means that Microsoft Planner is widely accessible. To start accessing Microsoft planner, one must first create a Microsoft 365 account. 

Planner enables users and teams to create plans, assemble and assign tasks, share files, communicate and collaborate with other users, and receive progress updates via various means. Microsoft Planner is linked with Microsoft 365 Groups, meaning that it is possible for users to collaborate through the platforms. Each new plan created in Planner automatically creates a new Microsoft 365 group.

References

External links 

Office 365 Planner on Office.com

Planner
Project management software
Task management software